CFWD-FM is a radio station in Saskatoon, Saskatchewan. Owned by Harvard Media, it broadcasts a rock-leaning classic hits format branded as 96.3 Cruz FM.

History
Licensed to Harvard Broadcasting on May 28, 2007, the station was originally scheduled to launch on 92.3 FM. However, it applied for a change of frequency to 96.3 FM, citing the potential for third-adjacent interference to CKBL.

On April 9, 2008, the new station signed on and began stunting with Christmas music as Santa FM in preparation for its official launch; the campaign also featured publicists parading the streets of Saskatoon in Santa Claus costumes. On April 11, 2008 at 3:00 p.m., the station officially launched with a contemporary hit radio (CHR) format branded as Wired 96.3.

On November 16, 2012, Harvard laid off CFWD's on-air personalities and announced that Wired 96.3 would sign off that night at midnight; at that time the station returned to Santa FM for the holiday season in preparation for another change in format scheduled for December 26. On December 26, 2012, at Noon, CFWD flipped to an adult hits format, branded as 96.3 Cruz FM.

References

External links
96.3 Cruz FM
 

Fwd
Fwd
Fwd
Radio stations established in 2007
2007 establishments in Saskatchewan